Derek Keith Weddle (27 December 1935 - 11 March 2023) was an English former professional footballer who played as an inside forward or a winger in the Football League for Sunderland, Portsmouth, Middlesbrough, Darlington and York City, in non-League football for Cambridge City and Gateshead and was on the books of Newcastle United  without making a league appearance.

References

1935 births
Living people
Footballers from Newcastle upon Tyne
English footballers
Association football wingers
Association football forwards
Newcastle United F.C. players
Sunderland A.F.C. players
Portsmouth F.C. players
Cambridge City F.C. players
Middlesbrough F.C. players
Darlington F.C. players
York City F.C. players
Gateshead F.C. players
English Football League players